The 9th Parliament of Antigua and Barbuda was elected on Thursday, 9 March 1989 and was dissolved on Friday, 18 February 1994.

The first session was held on Monday, 20 March 1989.

It was the last parliament that Vere Bird served as prime minister.

Acts of Parliament

1993

Statutory Instruments

1993

Members

Senate 
Unknown

House of Representatives 
Speaker: Hon. Casford L. Murray

References 

Parliaments of Antigua and Barbuda